Bampur County is in Sistan and Baluchestan province, Iran. The capital of the county is the city of Bampur. At the 2006 census, the region's population (as Bampur District of Iranshahr County) was 47,360 in 9,148 households. The following census in 2011 counted 54,042 people in 12,590 households. At the 2016 census, the district's population was 60,557 in 15,369 households. The district was separated from the county in 2018 to become Bampur County.

Administrative divisions

The population history and structural changes of Bampur County's administrative divisions (as Bampur District of Iranshahr County) over three consecutive censuses are shown in the following table.

References

 

Counties of Sistan and Baluchestan Province